Colcabamba is the capital of the district of Colcabamba District, Tayacaja Province, Huancavelica Region, Peru. According to the 2007 Peru Census, it has a population of 2,026. In 2015 that increased to 19,37.

References

Populated places in the Huancavelica Region